Fremont County School District #14 is a public school district based in Ethete, Wyoming, United States.

Geography
Fremont County School District #14 is located in central Fremont County and serves the following communities:

Census-designated places (Note: All census-designated places are unincorporated.)
Boulder Flats (most)
Ethete (most)

Schools
Wyoming Indian High School (Grades 9–12)
Wyoming Indian Middle School (Grades 6–8)
Wyoming Indian Elementary School (Grades PK-5)

Student demographics
The following figures are as of October 1, 2009.

Total District Enrollment: 536
Student enrollment by gender
Male: 278 (51.87%)
Female: 258 (48.13%)
Student enrollment by ethnicity
American Indian or Alaska Native: 534 (99.63%)
Hispanic or Latino: 1 (0.19%)
White: 1 (0.19%)

See also
List of school districts in Wyoming

References

External links
Fremont County School District #14 – official site.

Education in Fremont County, Wyoming
School districts in Wyoming